Lucy Edith Noel-Buxton, Baroness Noel-Buxton (née Pelham Burn; 1888 – 9 December 1960) was a British Labour Party politician.

Life 
She studied at Malvern St James then at Westfield College.   She married Noel Edward Buxton MP in London during the early summer of 1914.

Career 
Noel-Buxton was elected as Member of Parliament for North Norfolk at a by-election in 1930, after her husband, the MP Noel Buxton was elevated to the peerage as Baron Noel-Buxton. He had been Liberal Party MP for the seat until he was very narrowly defeated in 1918. After switching to the Labour Party he regained it in 1922 and held it at the next three elections. At the by-election Lady Noel-Buxton won the seat with a majority of only 139 votes over the Conservative candidate Thomas Cook. Cook opposed her again at the 1931 general election and this time she lost by nearly 7,000 votes as Labour suffered a landslide defeat nationally.   She stood again at the 1935 general election, and was again defeated, but did manage to halve Cook's majority.

Lady Noel-Buxton returned to the House of Commons in the Labour landslide at the 1945 general election, when she was elected for the 2-seat Norwich constituency. She did not contest the 1950 general election.

Personal life 
Lady Noel-Buxton had six children.

References

 

 Lucy Noel-Buxton at the Centre for Advancement of Women in Politics

External links 

1888 births
1960 deaths
Labour Party (UK) MPs for English constituencies
UK MPs 1929–1931
UK MPs 1945–1950
British baronesses
Female members of the Parliament of the United Kingdom for English constituencies
Members of the Parliament of the United Kingdom for Norwich
Alumni of Westfield College
20th-century British women politicians
20th-century English women
20th-century English people
Spouses of British politicians